The 2015 Campeonato Brasileiro Série A (officially the Brasileirão Chevrolet 2015 for sponsorship reasons) was the 59th edition of the Campeonato Brasileiro Série A, the top-level of professional football in Brazil. After winning twice in a row in the 2013 and 2014 seasons, Cruzeiro came in defending their title as the  Brazilian football champions. Corinthians won the title, their sixth overall and third since the introduction of the double round-robin in 2003.

Format
For the thirteenth consecutive season, the tournament was played in a double round-robin system. The team with the highest number of points at the end of the season was declared champion. The bottom four teams were relegated and will play in the Campeonato Brasileiro Série B in the 2016 season.

International qualification
The Série A served as a qualifier to CONMEBOL's 2016 Copa Libertadores. The top-three teams in the standings qualified to the Second Stage of the competition, while the fourth place in the standings qualified to the First Stage.

Teams
Despite Criciúma's relegation in the previous championship, it marked the first time four clubs from Santa Catarina took part of the same Brasileirão, at least in its current format; last time it happened, in 1979, the championship had more than 90 teams.

Stadia and locations

Number of teams by state

Personnel and kits

Managerial changes

Results

League table

Result table

Attendance

Average home attendances

Updated to games played on 6 December 2015.

Source: PerspectivaOnline.com.br

Season statistics

Top scorers

Top assists

Hat-tricks

4 Player scored 4 goals.

Source: ESPN FC & Globo

References 

 

Campeonato Brasileiro Série A seasons
1